Yunus İçuz (born 27 March 1983) is a Turkish professional football coach and a former player who played as an attacking midfielder. He is an assistant coach with Balıkesirspor.

Club career
He started his career in Balıkesirspor but he signed his first professional contract with Kartalspor (2001–04, 42 match 5 goals) and then he also played for Maltepespor (2004–06, 14 match 3 goals), Balıkesirspor (2006–07, 20 match 1 goal), Darıca Gençlerbirliği (2007–08, 18 match 1 goal).

He became a fan favorite with his spectacular goals and his good personality for Balkes fans.

Sometimes he known as Yunus İçöz in media.

External links

References

1983 births
Sportspeople from Balıkesir
Living people
Turkish footballers
Association football midfielders
Balıkesirspor footballers
Kartalspor footballers
Maltepespor footballers
Darıca Gençlerbirliği footballers
Kırklarelispor footballers
Nazilli Belediyespor footballers
TFF Second League players
TFF Third League players
Turkish football managers
Balıkesirspor managers